The 1962/63 NTFL season was the 42nd season of the Northern Territory Football League (NTFL).

Buffaloes have won there 13th premiership title while defeating St Marys in the grand final by 30 points.

Grand Final

References 

Northern Territory Football League seasons
NTFL